This is a list of buckwheat dishes, consisting of dishes that use buckwheat as a main ingredient. Buckwheat is a plant cultivated for its grain-like seeds and as a cover crop. A related and more bitter species, Fagopyrum tataricum, a domesticated food plant common in Asia, but not as common in Europe or North America, is also referred to as buckwheat.

Buckwheat dishes

 Ajdovi žganci – translates to English as "buckwheat spoonbread". It is a national Slovene dish. 
 Broeder – a traditional Dutch dish: a batter with buckwheat flour, yeast, and other ingredients is boiled in a cotton bag.
 Buckwheat pancake 
 Blini – an Eastern European pancake made with buckwheat flour
 Kaletez – a Breton pancake made with buckwheat flour
 Memil-buchimgae – a Korean pancake made with buckwheat flour
 Ploye – a pancake made of buckwheat flour, wheat flour, baking powder and water popular in Northeastern Canada and the United States
 Crêpe bretonne – a traditional dish in Lower Brittany, it can be made of wheat (sweet crêpe) or buckwheat (salted crêpe). This latter is less well-known and should not be confused with the buckwheat pancake typical of Upper Brittany, which has a different recipe.
 Crozets de Savoie – small flat square-shaped pasta originally made in the Savoie region in southeast France, the crozets were traditionally made at home by housewives using buckwheat or wheat, or sometimes both. 
 Galette-saucisse – a French street food item consisting of a hot sausage wrapped in a cold type of crêpe called galette de sarrasin or Breton galette. The French region known as Upper Brittany is the traditional homeland of the dish, which is prepared using buckwheat for the crêpe and pork sausage.
 Grechka – toasted buckwheat, often prepared with butter, commonly eaten in Eastern Europe.
 Jat-guksu – a Korean noodle dish consisting of buckwheat or wheat flour noodles in a bowl of cold broth made from ground pine nuts. It is a local specialty of Gapyeong, Gyeonggi Province, South Korea.
 Kasha varnishkes – a traditional Ashkenazi Jewish dish that combines grechka (buckwheat groats) with noodles, typically farfalle (bow-tie pasta).
 Kig ha farz – a cooked dish eaten traditionally in Brittany consisting of various meats simmered in a broth with a buckwheat flour based pudding.
 Mak-guksu – a Korean buckwheat noodle dish served in a chilled broth and sometimes with sugar, mustard, sesame oil or vinegar.
 Memil-muk – a Korean dish consisting of a light gray-brown muk (jelly) made from buckwheat starch. It is commonly served as banchan (a side dish accompanying rice) as well as anju (food accompanying alcoholic drinks). 
 Mezzelune –  a semi-circular stuffed pasta, similar to ravioli or pierogi. The dough is usually made of white flour or buckwheat flour, durum semolina, and mixed with eggs and olive oil. 
 Naengmyeon – a Korean noodle dish of long and thin handmade noodles made from the flour and starch of various ingredients, including buckwheat, potatoes, sweet potatoes, arrowroot starch and kudzu.
 Oyaki – a Japanese dumpling made from a fermented buckwheat dough wrapped around a stuffing of Japanese vegetables, fruit, or anko bean paste and then roasted on an iron pan.
 Pizzoccheri – an Italian pasta from Valtellina, Lombardy.
 Poffert – a traditional Dutch dish from Groningen; a batter containing buckwheat flour and other ingredients is cooked au bain marie in a special tin 
 Poffertjes – a traditional Dutch batter treat resembling small, fluffy pancakes; they are made with yeast and buckwheat flour and have a light, spongy texture.
 Scrapple – a Pennsylvania Dutch mush of pork scraps, flour (can be wheat or buckwheat), and spices often eaten for breakfast.
 Soba – the Japanese name for buckwheat, it usually refers to thin noodles made from buckwheat flour, or a combination of buckwheat and wheat flours (nagano soba).
 Stip – a regional dish in the Dutch provinces of Groningen, Drenthe and Overijssel, it is served as buckwheat porridge with a hole containing fried bacon and a spoonful of syrup.
 Buchweizentorte – a traditional cake from the Italian South Tyrol region made of buckwheat flour.

Beverages

 Buckwheat tea – a tea prepared using roasted buckwheat
 Buckwheat whisky – a type of distilled alcoholic beverage produced entirely or principally from buckwheat.

See also

 Buckwheat § Culinary use – detailed information about buckwheat as a food source
 Buckwheat honey
 List of edible seeds
 List of poppy seed pastries and dishes
 List of sesame seed dishes

References

 
Lists of foods by ingredient